Family Pack (lit. "What Did Women Do When Men Walked on the Moon?") is a 2000 drama film, directed by Chris Vander Stappen.

Plot
July 1969. After two years in Canada, Sacha is back in her small city in Belgium. She has two disruptive news for her family. The first is that instead of being married or at least engaged, she has a lesbian Canadian girlfriend; and the second is not better: instead of studying radiology in Montreal, she abandoned the studies despite the fact that her family had made huge sacrifices.

Cast

 Marie Bunel as Sacha Kessler
 Hélène Vincent as Esther Kessler
 Mimie Mathy as Elisa Kessler
 Tsilla Chelton as Lea 
 Macha Grenon as Odile
 Christian Crahay as Oscar Kessler
 Emmanuel Bilodeau as Antoine
 Michel Israel as Jules
 Jacques Lavallée as Louis
 Marie-Lise Pilote as Debbie
 Mario Saint-Amand as Bob

Production
The movie was first screened to the Chicago International Film Festival in 2000. Before it was released, it was also screened to the Turin International Gay and Lesbian Film Festival (Italy), in 2001.

In 2002 it was screened to the Febio Film Festival (Czech Republic) and to the Japan International Gay and Lesbian Film Festival (Japan).

Accolades

References

External links

2000 films
2000 drama films
2000 LGBT-related films
French drama films
French LGBT-related films
French-language Canadian films
Belgian drama films
Belgian LGBT-related films
Canadian drama films
Canadian LGBT-related films
Swiss drama films
Swiss LGBT-related films
Lesbian-related films
LGBT-related drama films
2000s Canadian films
2000s French films